Antônio Lira (13 November 1909 – 23 August 1963) was a Brazilian athlete. He competed in the men's shot put at the 1932 Summer Olympics and the 1936 Summer Olympics.

References

External links
 

1909 births
1963 deaths
Athletes (track and field) at the 1932 Summer Olympics
Athletes (track and field) at the 1936 Summer Olympics
Brazilian male shot putters
Olympic athletes of Brazil
Place of birth missing
Assassinated Brazilian people
Deaths by firearm in Brazil
20th-century Brazilian people